Ivor Robinson (October 7, 1923 – May 27, 2016) was a British-American mathematical physicist, born and educated in England, noted for his important contributions to the theory of relativity. He was a principal organizer of the Texas Symposium on Relativistic Astrophysics.

Biography
Born in Liverpool, October 7, 1923, "into a comfortable Jewish middle-class family", Ivor Robinson read mathematics at Cambridge University as an undergraduate, where he was influenced by Abram Samoilovitch Besicovitch. He took his  B.A. in Mathematics in 1947. His first academic placements were at University College of Wales, King's College London, University of North Carolina, University of Hamburg, Syracuse University and Cornell University.

Alfred Schild was developing a department strong in relativity at Austin, Texas, when a second Texas center for relativity research was proposed. Lloyd Berkner was directing the Southwest Center for Advanced Studies at Dallas and brought Ivor Robinson there in 1963 when it was a "windowless cube on the Southern Methodist University campus". Robinson was head of the Mathematics and Mathematical Physics division.  "Ivor was charged with the formation of a mathematical physics group concentrating on general relativity and cosmology." He brought Istvan Ozsváth and Wolfgang Rindler to the Dallas area as permanent members of the newly formed group, alongside a host of distinguished visitors and temporary appointments. This institution became the University of Texas at Dallas.

According to Rindler, "No one who knew him will forget what a brilliant conversationalist he was, with his sonorous deep voice and ultra-English accent, with his convictions and occasional mischievousness." "Ivor Robinson is a brilliant mathematician who showed us the elegant simplicity of space-time by pointing to its null structure."

Robinson retired in 2000, remaining Professor Emeritus in the Department of Mathematical Sciences at the University of Texas at Dallas.

Scientific Contributions
Ivor Robinson contributed extensively to modern developments in the theory of relativity. He is known for his pioneering work on null electromagnetic fields, for his collaboration with Andrzej Trautman on models for spherical gravitational waves, and for the Bel–Robinson tensor. Roger Penrose has credited him as an important influence in the development of twistor theory, through his construction of the so-called Robinson congruences.

Texas Symposium on Relativistic Astrophysics
Astrophysical sciences developed with attention to spectra of celestial sources to ascertain the chemical origin of these sources. The addition of radio astronomy extended the range of these spectra and revealed quasi-stellar sources with peculiar spectra. Maarten Schmidt and Jesse Greenstein found extreme red shifts in their studies, which demanded an explanation. Relativistic astrophysics offered its services as a generator of models such as black holes and their environs. Robinson, Schücking, and others organized the first Texas Symposium on Relativistic Astrophysics for December, 1963, in Dallas.  The Proceedings were published by University of Chicago Press as Quasi-stellar Sources and Gravitational Collapse.  "It is now conventional wisdom that quasars are probably powered by rotating black holes, but it was here at Dallas that the black hole concept emerged as a serious astronomical hypothesis." It was also at this Symposium that Roy Kerr presented his two page paper on the mathematics of rotating black holes. Of this S. Chandrasekhar (Nobel laureate, 1983) is quoted as saying "In my entire scientific life, extending over forty-five years, the most shattering experience has been the realization that an exact solution of Einstein's equations of general relativity, discovered by the New Zealand mathematician, Roy Kerr, provides the absolutely exact representation of untold numbers of massive black holes that populate the universe" 

The following year, a second Symposium, had Quasars and High-energy Astronomy as its published proceedings. The series continued with Symposia in alternate years. The sixth Symposium, held in New York in 1972, had its proceedings published by the New York Academy of Sciences. The following volumes of the Annals of the Academy are proceedings of the Symposium series: 224, 264, 302, 336, 375, 422, 470, 571, 647, 688, and 759. In 1974 the Symposium was back in Dallas, but then it travelled: Boston, Munich (twice), Baltimore, Austin (twice), Jerusalem, Chicago, Brighton, Berkeley, Paris, Stanford, and many subsequent venues. From the point of view of astrophysics, a rotating  black hole corresponds to a Kerr metric. The astronomical picture of a quasar involves an active galactic nucleus with a supermassive black hole.

Works
 1959: (with Hermann Bondi and Felix Pirani) "Gravitational Waves in General Relativity III. Exact Plane Waves", Proceedings of the Royal Society A 251:519-533 .
 1960: (with Andrzej Trautman) "Spherical Gravitational Waves", Physical Review Letters 4:431.
 1961: "Null Electromagnetic Fields", Journal of Mathematical Physics 2:290,1 
 1962: (with Peter G. Bergmann and Engelbert Schücking) "Asymptotic Properties of a System with Nonzero Total Mass", Physical Review 126(3):1227 
 1962: (with Andrzej Trautman) "Some Spherical Gravitational Waves in General Relativity", Proceedings of the Royal Society A  
 1963; (with Alfred Schild) "Generalization of a Theorem by Goldberg and Sachs", Journal of Mathematical Physics 4:484  
 1964: (with Andrzej Trautman) "Exact Degenerate Solutions of Einstein’s Equations", in Relativistic Theories of Gravitation edited by Leopold Infeld, Pergamon Press
 1969: (with J.R. Robinson and J.D. Zund) "Degenerate Gravitational Fields with Twisting Rays", Journal of Mathematics and Mechanics 18(9):881–92 
 1969: (with Alfred Schild and H. Strauss) "The Generalized Reissner-Nordstrom Solution", International Journal of Theoretical Physics 2(3):243–5 
 1969: (with Joanna R. Robinson) "Vacuum Metrics without Symmetry", International Journal of Theoretical Physics 2(3):231–42 
 1975: "On Vacuum Metrics of Type (3,1)", General Relativity and Gravitation 6(4):423–7 
 1976: (with Jerzy Plebanski) "Left-degenerate Vacuum Metrics", Physical Review Letters 37(9):493 
 1977: (with Alberto Garcia and Jerzy Plebanski) "Null Strings and Complex Einstein-Maxwell Fields with Cosmological Constant", General Relativity and Gravitation 8(10):841–54 
 1978: (with Jerzy Plebanski) "Electromagnetic and Gravitational Hertz Potentials", Journal of Mathematical Physics 19(11):2350–8 
 1982: "Null Congruences and Plebanski-Schild Spaces", in Spacetime and Geometry: The Alfred Schild Lectures, University of Texas Press
 1983: (with Andrzej Trautman) "Conformal Geometry of Flows in N Dimensions", Journal of Mathematical Physics 24:1425 
 1984: (with Krzysztof Rozga) "Lightlike Contractions on Minkowski Spacetime", Journal of Mathematical Physics 25(3): 499 to 505 
 1984: (with Krzysztof Rozga) "On Some Family of Congruences of Null Strings", Journal of Mathematical Physics 25(3): 589 to 96 
 1984: (with Krzysztof Rozga) "Congruence of Null Strings in Complex Spacetimes and Some Cauchy-Kovaleski-type Problems", Journal of Mathematical Physics 25(6):1941–6 
 1985: (with Istvan Ozsvath and Krzysztof Rozga) "Plane-fronted Gravitational and Electromagnetic Waves in Spaces with Cosmological Constant", Journal of Mathematical Physics 26(7):1755–61 
 1985: (with Peter A. Hogan) "The Motion of Charged Test Particles in General Relativity", Foundations of Physics 15(5): 617–27 
 1985: (with Andrzej Trautman) "Integrable Optical Geometry", Letters in Mathematical Physics 10(2–3) 
 1993: (with Edward P. Wilson) "The Generalized Taub-NUT Congruence in Minkowski Spaces", General Relativity and Gravitation 25(3)
 1993: (with Andrzej Trautman) "The Conformal Geometry of Complex Quadrics and the Fractional-Linear Form of Möbius Transformations", Journal of Mathematical Physics 34(11):5391–5406  
 1997: "On the Bel-Robinson Tensor", Classical and Quantum Gravity 14(1A);A331–3
 1998: (with Paul MacAlevey) "An Invariant of Type N Spaces", Classical and Quantum Gravity 15(12): 3935,6
 2000: (with Bogdan Nita) "An Invariant of Null Spinor Fields", Classical and Quantum Gravity 17(10):2149–52.
 2002: (with P. Downes, P. MacAlevey, and B. Nita) "Approximate Solutions of Type (3,1) and (4)" International Journal of Modern Physics A 17(20): 2733,4

References

 Wolfgang Rindler and Andrzej Trautman, editors (1987) Gravitation and Geometry: A Volume in Honour of Ivor Robinson, Bibliopolis Edizioni di Filosofia e Scienze, Italy .

External links 
 
 

English Jews
American physicists
Jewish American scientists
American people of English-Jewish descent
University of Texas at Dallas faculty
Jewish scientists
1923 births
2016 deaths
British relativity theorists
British expatriates in Germany
British emigrants to the United States
21st-century American Jews